Sándor Kocsis was a footballer who represented the Hungary national football team as a striker between 1948 and 1956. He scored his first international goal on 6 June 1948, during a 1948 Balkan Cup match against Romania. Since then, he has become his country's second top scorer in international football, and the fourth overall men's international goalscorer in Europe, having scored 75 goals in 68 appearances for Hungary. Only Portugal's Cristiano Ronaldo (117), fellow countryman Ferenc Puskás (84), and Poland's Robert Lewandowski (77) have netted more international goals in Europe than him. When he retired he was the world's second all-time top goal scorer only behind teammate Ferenc Puskás.

On 20 November 1949, Kocsis scored his first international hat-trick against Sweden during a Friendly match. He has scored a national record of seven international hat-tricks, and on one occasion, four international goals in a single match, on 20 June 1954, during a 1954 World Cup match against the eventual champions, West Germany.

International goals 

Hungary score listed first, score column indicates score after each Kocsis goal.

(* Non-FIFA match)

Hat-tricks

Statistics

See also 
 List of men's footballers with 50 or more international goals

References 

Puskas, Ferenc
Puskas
Puskás